James Bogle (4 January 1893 – 19 October 1963) was an Australian cricketer. He played fifteen first-class matches for New South Wales between 1918/19 and 1920/21.

See also
 List of New South Wales representative cricketers

References

External links
 

1893 births
1963 deaths
Australian cricketers
New South Wales cricketers
Cricketers from Sydney